The Gotha WD.3 (for Wasser Doppeldecker - "Water Biplane") was a pusher reconnaissance floatplane built in prototype form in Germany in 1915.

Development
Since 1913, Gotha had been manufacturing a series of reconnaissance seaplanes for the Imperial German Navy, initially patterned on the Avro 503. These were intended as unarmed scouts, but as World War I unfolded, it became desirable to arm this type of aircraft. In the days before the development of the interrupter gear, the most effective way to mount a gun with a forward firing arc  was to dispense with a conventional fuselage, relocate the engine to the rear of a nacelle that also carried the cockpit, weapons, and wings, and carry the tail on booms stretching back either side of the engine and propeller installation. While Gotha had built copies of the Caudron G.3 as the LD.3 and LD.4, the resulting aircraft had more in common with the contemporary AGO C.I and C.II as similar molded booms were used instead of a lattice frame, and the Caudron used a tractor engine. Only a single prototype was built however, and Gotha's subsequent efforts would focus on other configurations.

Specifications (WD.3)

References

Further reading

 
 

1910s German military reconnaissance aircraft
WD.03
Floatplanes
Single-engined pusher aircraft
Biplanes
Twin-boom aircraft
Aircraft first flown in 1915